The 1998 World Weightlifting Championships were held in Lahti, Finland from November 7 to November 15. The men's competition in the bantamweight (56 kg) division was staged on 10 November 1998.

Medalists

Records

Results

References
IWF Archive
Results
Weightlifting World Championships Seniors Statistics, Page 14 

1998 World Weightlifting Championships